Anton Colander (1590, Weißenfels – 1621, Dresden) was a German (Electoral Saxon) composer and organist.

He was a childhood friend of Heinrich Schütz, studying law in Leipzig with Schütz's brother Benjamin from 1610.

In 1616 he was appointed to the post of organist at the Dresden court and began taking composition classes with Schütz. He was followed as organist by Johann Klemm, Kaspar Kittel, and Matthias Weckmann.

Works, editions and recordings
Geistliche Konzerte, 1643
Recordings
Wie ein Rubin in feinem Golde leuchtet, Concerto

References

1590 births
1621 deaths
17th-century classical composers
17th-century German people
German Baroque composers
German classical composers
German male classical composers
German classical musicians
German organists
German male organists
People from Weißenfels
People from the Electorate of Saxony
Pupils of Heinrich Schütz
17th-century male musicians